Irajabad (also known as Ţarāz) is a village in Sheshtaraz Rural District, Sheshtaraz District, Khalilabad County, Razavi Khorasan Province, Iran. At the 2006 census, its population was 137, in 39 families.

References 

Populated places in Khalilabad County